The Justice League, also called the Justice League of America or JLA, is a fictional superhero team that appears in comic books published by DC Comics. Since their first appearance in The Brave and the Bold #28 (February/March 1960), various incarnations of the team have appeared in film, television, and video game adaptations.

Film

Live-action

Justice League: Mortal (cancelled)
In February 2007, it was announced that Warner Bros hired husband and wife duo Michele and Kieran Mulroney to write a script for a Justice League film. The news came around the same time that Joss Whedon's long-developed Wonder Woman film had been canceled, as well as The Flash, written and directed by David S. Goyer. Titled Justice League: Mortal, Michele and Kiernan Mulroney submitted their script to Warner Bros. in June 2007, receiving positive feedback, which prompted the studio to immediately fast track production in the hopes of filming to begin before the 2007-2008 Writers Guild of America strike. Warner Bros. was less willing to proceed on development with a sequel to Superman Returns, having been disappointed with the box office return. Brandon Routh was not approached to reprise the role of Superman in Justice League Mortal, nor was Christian Bale from Batman Begins. Warner Bros. intended for Justice League: Mortal to be the start of a new film franchise, and to branch out into separate sequels and spin-offs. Shortly after filming finished with The Dark Knight, Bale stated in an interview that "It’d be better if it doesn't tread on the toes of what our Batman series is doing," though he personally felt it would make more sense for Warner Bros. to release the film after his planned "Batman 3" (later called The Dark Knight Rises). Jason Reitman was the original choice to direct Justice League, but he turned it down, as he considers himself an independent filmmaker and prefers to stay out of big budget superhero films. George Miller signed to direct in September 2007, with Barrie Osbourne producing on a projected $220 million budget.

The following month roughly 40 actors and actresses were auditioning for the ensemble superhero roles, among them were Joseph Cross, Michael Angarano, Max Thieriot, Minka Kelly, Adrianne Palicki and Scott Porter. Miller intended to cast younger actors as he wanted them to "grow" into their roles over the course of several films. D. J. Cotrona was cast as Superman, along with Armie Hammer as Batman. Jessica Biel reportedly declined the Wonder Woman role after being in negotiations. The character was also linked to actresses Teresa Palmer and Shannyn Sossamon, along with Mary Elizabeth Winstead, who confirmed that she had auditioned. Ultimately Megan Gale was cast as Wonder Woman, while Palmer was cast as Talia al Ghul, whom Miller had in mind to act with a Russian accent. The script for Justice League: Mortal would have featured the John Stewart character as the Green Lantern, a role originally offered to Columbus Short. Hip hop recording artist and rapper Common was cast, with Adam Brody as The Flash / Barry Allen, and Jay Baruchel as the lead villain, Maxwell Lord. Longtime Miller collaborator Hugh Keays-Byrne had been cast as Martian Manhunter. Aquaman had yet to be cast. Marit Allen was hired as the original costume designer before her untimely death in November 2007, and the responsibilities were assumed by Weta Workshop.

However, the Writers Strike began that same month and placed the film on hold. Warner Bros. had to let the options lapse for the cast, but development was fast tracked once more in February 2008 when the strike ended. Warner Bros. and Miller wanted to start filming immediately, but production was pushed back three months. Originally, the majority of Justice League: Mortal would be shot at Fox Studios Australia in Sydney, with other locations scouted nearby at local colleges, and Sydney Heads doubling for Happy Harbor. The Australian Film Commission also had a say with casting choices, giving way for George Miller to cast Gale, Palmer and Keays-Bryne, all Australian natives. The production crew was composed entirely of Australians, but the Australian government denied Warner Bros. a 40 percent tax rebate as they felt they had not hired enough Australian actors. Miller was frustrated, stating that "A once-in-a-lifetime opportunity for the Australian film industry is being frittered away because of very lazy thinking. They're throwing away hundreds of millions of dollars of investment that the rest of the world is competing for and, much more significantly, highly skilled creative jobs." Production offices were then moved to Vancouver Film Studios in Canada. Filming was pushed back to July 2008, while Warner Bros was still confident they could release the film for a summer 2009 release.

With production delays continuing, and the success of The Dark Knight in 2008, Warner Bros. decided to focus on development of individual films featuring the main heroes, allowing director Christopher Nolan to separately complete his Batman trilogy with The Dark Knight Rises in 2012. Gregory Noveck, senior vice president of creative affairs for DC Entertainment stated "we’re going to make a Justice League movie, whether it’s now or 10 years from now. But we’re not going to do it and Warners is not going to do it until we know it’s right." Actor Adam Brody joked "They [Warner Brothers] just didn’t want to cross their streams with a whole bunch of Batmans in the universe." Warner Bros. relaunched development for the solo Green Lantern film, released in 2011 as a critical and financial disappointment. Meanwhile, film adaptations for The Flash and Wonder Woman continued to languish in development while filming for a Superman reboot was commencing in 2011 with Man of Steel, produced by Nolan and written by David S. Goyer, which would go on to launch the DC Extended Universe.

DC Extended Universe (DCEU)

The Justice League are a common narrative plot thread in the DC Extended Universe starting with Batman v Superman: Dawn of Justice with Superman, Batman and Wonder Woman teaming up against Doomsday and in Suicide Squad where Bruce gets the files on Barry Allen and Arthur Curry from Amanda Waller.

The theatrical version of a live action Justice League movie was released in November 2017 and received mixed reviews from critics and earned over $657 million worldwide. The film was directed by Joss Whedon and Zack Snyder although Snyder is the only person to receive a directing credit for the film. Whedon was brought on as a consultant, then given control over the project after Snyder stepped down following his daughter's death, and the film was rewritten by Whedon, with the original script being completed by Chris Terrio. The film stars Ben Affleck as Bruce Wayne / Batman, Henry Cavill as Clark Kent / Superman, Gal Gadot as Diana Prince / Wonder Woman,  Ezra Miller as Barry Allen / The Flash, Jason Momoa as Arthur Curry / Aquaman and Ray Fisher as Victor Stone / Cyborg. The film also stars Amy Adams as Lois Lane, Jeremy Irons as Alfred Pennyworth, Diane Lane as Martha Kent, Connie Nielsen as Hippolyta, Joe Morton as Silas Stone, Ciarán Hinds as Steppenwolf, Amber Heard as Mera and J. K. Simmons as James Gordon.

Snyder and Warner Bros released a 4 hour director's cut of Justice League via HBO Max on March 18, 2021. This version presents  Snyder's original vision for a Justice League film with a much more grounded and generally darker tone as well as an overall aesethetic more in line with Snyder's previous DCEU films Man of Steel and Batman v Superman: Dawn of Justice rather than the lighter, more family friendly tone of the 2017 theatrical cut and features a radically overhauled ending. Additional footage seen in this cut is mainly footage that was shot for the theatrical cut but was discarded when Snyder left the project although a handful of new scenes were filmed once the director's cut release was greenlit.  Characters who did not appear in the theatrical cut in 2017 such as Martian Manhunter, Iris West, Ryan Choi, Darkseid and Desaad are also included in this version of the film. This new cut also features a completely new score by Tom Holkenborg aka Junkie XL. Holkenborg was originally signed on to score the theatrical version of Justice League in 2017 but was replaced by Danny Elfman during the film's reshoots in June 2017.
 The team made a cameo appearance in the Peacemaker season 1 finale episode "It's Cow or Never" with only Momoa and Miller reprising their roles as Aquaman and Flash while Superman and Wonder Woman were played by stand-ins.
 In a mid-credit scene of Shazam! Fury of the Gods, A.R.G.U.S. agents Emilia Harcourt and John Economos often Billy Bateson / Shazam in joining the Justice Society thinking that he was joining the Justice League. 
 An alternate version of the Justice League will be featured in The Flash (2023) and will consist of two versions of Barry (one from the main timeline and one from the past, both played by Miller), an alternate version of Bruce Wayne / Batman (played by Michael Keaton) and Kara Zor-El / Supergirl (played by Sasha Calle). Both Affleck and Gadot are set to cameo as their versions of Batman and Wonder Woman in the film as well.

Animation
 Justice League: The New Frontier is a direct-to-video animated film adaptation of popular DC Comics limited series DC: The New Frontier released on DVD, HD DVD, and Blu-ray Disc in the United States on February 26, 2008. The film was written by Justice League writer Stan Berkowitz, with Darwyn Cooke serving as story and visual consultant.
 In Superman/Batman: Public Enemies, some members of the Justice League (Captain Atom, Power Girl, Starfire, Black Lightning, Captain Marvel and Hawkman) as well as several other superheroes, are shown working for President Lex Luthor.
 Another direct-to-video film titled Justice League: Crisis on Two Earths was released in 2010. The film was originally brought up as a possible return to the Justice League Unlimited animated series with the title Justice League: Worlds Collide. Justice League: Worlds Collide would have been set in the DC animated universe. It was originally going to be produced concurrently with the first season of Justice League Unlimited, bridging the gap between the second season of Justice League and the relaunched show. The production was shelved just before the start of filming, but the script was later adapted into the direct-to-video film Justice League: Crisis on Two Earths, with changes that included removing all references to the DCAU continuity. As a result, the feature as originally intended is now unlikely to ever be produced. The film featured a League consisting of Batman, Superman, Wonder Woman, Green Lantern, The Flash, and Martian Manhunter. Aquaman, Firestorm, Black Canary, Red Tornado and Black Lightning appeared near the end of the film, and were supposedly offered full-time membership by Batman. In addition, alternate versions of Justice League Detroit (save for Steel) were shown as part of the Crime Syndicate of America, as were Black Canary and Green Arrow analogues. Analogues of Zatanna, Blue Beetle (Ted Kord), Power Girl and Red Tornado made brief cameos on a computer screen.
 Another animated feature, Justice League: Doom, was released in February 2012. The film featured a Justice League consisting of Superman, Batman, Cyborg, the Flash (Barry Allen), Green Lantern (Hal Jordan), Wonder Woman and Martian Manhunter.
 DC released another animated film on July 30, 2013, entitled Justice League: The Flashpoint Paradox. The film, based on the Flashpoint crossover, is centered on the Flash, who inadvertently changes the time stream by travelling back in time to save his mother. In the new world created, Flash finds himself speedless in a world without a Justice League and suffering from a devastating war between the Atlanteans and Amazonians. Relying on the help of Batman, in this world a vengeful, alcoholic Thomas Wayne, the Flash must find the prime suspect, Professor Zoom, and find a way to fix the time stream.
 Another animated feature, Lego Batman: The Movie – DC Super Heroes Unite, was released in early February 2013 and features members of the Justice League, particularly Batman and Superman, fighting Lex Luthor and The Joker in Lego form.
 In DC Showcase: Green Arrow, Green Arrow and Black Canary are members of the Justice League and their logo was seen on Oliver's phone.
 A version of the Justice League similar to The New 52 appears in the DC Animated Movie Universe, first appearing in Justice League: War, with a team consisting of Superman, Batman, Wonder Woman, Cyborg, Flash (Barry Allen), Green Lantern (Hal Jordan), and Shazam. The same team appears in Justice League: Throne of Atlantis, with Aquaman as a newcomer. Superman, Batman, Cyborg, Flash and Wonder Woman appear in Justice League vs. Teen Titans. Justice League Dark appears in their own animated film Justice League Dark, with the cast including Batman, Zatanna, John Constantine, Etrigan the Demon, Deadman, Swamp Thing and Black Orchid. The traditional Justice League team appears as well, consisting of Batman, Superman, Wonder Woman, Green Lantern (John Stewart), Flash (Barry Allen), Hawkman and Martian Manhunter.
 The Justice League is featured in the animated film JLA Adventures: Trapped in Time. The team consists of Superman, Batman, Cyborg, The Flash (Barry Allen), Wonder Woman and Aquaman. Karate Kid, Dawnstar, and Robin appear as well.
 The Justice League appears in DC Super Heroes vs. Eagle Talon. The team consists of Batman, Superman, Wonder Woman, Flash (Barry Allen), Aquaman and Cyborg.
 The Justice League appears in the "Tomorrowverse" continuity which begun with Superman: Man of Tomorrow. First alluded in Justice Society: World War II, the team makes a brief appearance in Green Lantern: Beware My Power, consisting of Martian Manhunter (who is presumably the leader of the League), Vixen and Green Arrow. Superman, Wonder Woman, Batman, and Flash are also stated to have joined the League. Green Lantern Hal Jordan was also a former member of the League, before he is succeeded by John Stewart.

Other appearances
 The Justice League appears in The Lego Movie, with Superman voiced by Channing Tatum, Batman voiced by Will Arnett, Wonder Woman by Cobie Smulders, and Green Lantern (Hal Jordan) by Jonah Hill. Flash (Barry Allen) and Aquaman also appear in the movie, although they have no lines. The Justice League also appeared in The Lego Batman Movie. 
 The Justice League appears in Teen Titans Go! To the Movies, with Superman voiced by Nicolas Cage, Batman voiced by Jimmy Kimmel, Wonder Woman voiced by Halsey and Green Lantern (John Stewart) voiced by Lil Yachty. Other members of the League, such as Aquaman (voiced by Eric Bauza), the Atom (Ray Palmer) (voiced by Patton Oswalt), Flash (Barry Allen) (voiced by Wil Wheaton), Green Lantern (Hal Jordan) and Shazam also appear in cameos.
 The Justice League makes a cameo appearance in Space Jam: A New Legacy. The group consists of Superman, Flash, Green Lantern (John Stewart), Aquaman and Batgirl.
 The Justice League appears in DC League of Super-Pets, with Superman voiced by John Krasinski, Batman voiced by Keanu Reeves, Wonder Woman voiced by Jameela Jamil, Green Lantern (Jessica Cruz) voiced by Dascha Polanco, Flash (Barry Allen) voiced by John Early, Aquaman voiced by Jemaine Clement and Cyborg (Victor Stone) voiced by Daveed Diggs.

Television
Justice League of America has been adapted for television numerous times.

Animation
 The first animated appearance of the Justice League was in the 1967 television series The Superman/Aquaman Hour of Adventure. The team appeared in only three segments of the run of the show. The members seen are Superman, Green Lantern, Hawkman, Flash, and the Atom.
 The longest-running version of the Justice League was the loosely adapted series called Super Friends, which ran in various incarnations from 1973 to 1986.
 The Justice League make their first appearance in the DC animated universe in "The Call", a two-part episode of Batman Beyond. It portrayed a futuristic version of the team, referred to as "Justice League Unlimited", or "JLU" for short. The lineup consisted of an aging Superman, a brand new Green Lantern, Big Barda, plus new characters: Aquagirl (Aquaman's daughter), Micron (similar to Atom), and Warhawk (who is later revealed to be the son of Green Lantern and Hawkgirl). Though he does not appear in Batman Beyond, Static and his ally Gear are also revealed to be members of the future Justice League in the Static Shock episode "Future Shock".
 Cartoon Network's Justice League series debuted in 2001 and lasted for two seasons. Although not the Justice League's first appearance in the DC animated universe, it was their first chronological appearance. In July 2004, the series was retitled and revised for its third, fourth, and fifth seasons as Justice League Unlimited. Both of these were extensions of the DC animated universe, continuing the continuity begun by Batman: The Animated Series, Superman: The Animated Series, The New Batman Adventures, Static Shock, Batman Beyond, and The Zeta Project.
 In the two-part fourth season finale of The Batman, titled "The Joining", Batman allied with Martian Manhunter against aliens known as "the Joining". At the end of the second episode, J'onn contacts Batman and asks him to join his group, prompting Batman to remark that J'onn has formed "quite a league". The members of the "League" featured in this sequence were Green Lantern, Green Arrow, Hawkman, and the Flash. In "The Batman/Superman Story, Part Two", Superman joins up with the Justice League. Much of the fifth season revolves around team-ups with League members and Batman. Other elements that were put forth included Batman recruiting Superman, and a headquarters combining elements of the Hall of Justice from Super Friends and the Watchtower from Justice League.
 "The League" is mentioned in a conversation between Batman and Plastic Man in an episode of Batman: The Brave and the Bold. Presumably, this refers to the Justice League. In fact, the show has featured many team-ups that included various heroes that were members of the JLA at one time or another, such as Adam Strange, Aquaman, Batman, Black Canary, Blue Beetle, Booster Gold, Captain Marvel, Elongated Man, Etrigan the Demon, Fire, Ice, Firestorm (both Ronald Raymond and Jason Rusch), Green Arrow, Roy Harper, Guy Gardner, Hal Jordan, G'nort, Kilowog, Huntress, Mister Miracle, Oberon, Big Barda, Black Lightning, Metamorpho, Phantom Stranger, Plastic Man, Red Tornado, Superman, Wonder Woman, Martian Manhunter, the Flash, Vixen, and Zatanna. The League itself is later seen in a flashback, meeting aboard the Satellite in "Sidekicks Assemble!". The roster seen consists of Batman, Superman, Wonder Woman, Green Lantern (Hal Jordan), the Flash (Barry Allen), Aquaman, the Martian Manhunter, Black Canary, Green Arrow, Red Tornado, and Fire, though Superman and Wonder Woman have no dialogue and are seen only from behind due to the characters not being available to the show at the time. The Justice League International is featured in "Darkseid Descending!", and consists of Batman, Aquaman, Martian Manhunter, Fire and Ice, Guy Gardner, Booster Gold and Blue Beetle (Jaime Reyes). It is mentioned by Aquaman that there had been a previous incarnation of the JLA (presumably the original roster featured in "Sidekicks Assemble!"), and that it had disbanded under unpleasant circumstances.
 A twenty-person roster of the Justice League appears in the Young Justice animated series as mentors to the young heroes. The cast includes Bruce Greenwood as Batman, Phil LaMarr as Aquaman, Alan Tudyk as Green Arrow, Rob Lowe (and Chad Lowe) as Captain Marvel, Nolan North as Superman and Zatara (later Doctor Fate), George Eads as Flash, Kevin Michael Richardson as Martian Manhunter and John Stewart, Vanessa Marshall as Black Canary, Dee Bradley Baker as Hal Jordan, Maggie Q as Wonder Woman, Jeff Bennett as Red Tornado, Michael T. Weiss as Captain Atom and Zehra Fazal as Hawkwoman. In the two-part pilot episode "Independence Day" (with the second part being renamed "Fireworks"), Hawkman is also shown as part of the team as well. At the end of the episode, Red Tornado volunteers to watch over the members of Young Justice as their guardian, while Black Canary is assigned as their combat instructor. The members of Young Justice operate out of the Secret Sanctuary in Happy Harbor, which Batman, the leader of the Justice League, describes as having been the original headquarters of the JL during their early years. Speedy explains that the Justice League currently operates out of the Watchtower in space while using the Hall of Justice in Washington, D.C. as a decoy headquarters to misdirect enemies and the general public. In "Usual Suspects", Red Arrow, Atom, Icon, Doctor Fate and Plastic Man officially joined the team. 
In the season 2 premiere, it is confirmed that Black Lightning, as well as former Young Justice members Zatanna and Rocket have joined the team as well. 
As of the conclusion of season 3, the roster officially consists of 33 members: Atom, Aquaman, Batman, Batwoman, Black Canary, Black Lightning, Blue Devil, Captain Atom, Captain Marvel/Shazam, Doctor Fate, Elongated Man, Fire, Flash, Green Arrow, Green Lantern (Guy Gardner, Hal Jordan, John Stewart), Hardware, Hawkman, Hawkwoman, Ice, Icon, Katana, Magog, Martian Manhunter, Metamorpho, Plastic Man, Red Tornado, Rocket, Steel, Superman, Wonder Woman and Zatanna, with 3 further members (Aquaman, Red Arrow and Zatara) having retired or left the League.
 In a sketch for Mad, Superman, Batman, and Wonder Woman are convinced to change the name from the Super Friends to the Justice League after a musical appeal by fellow heroes.
 The Justice League is re-imagined as animals in the DC Nation Shorts Farm League with Superman as Supermanatee, Batman as a mouse, Wonder Woman as Wonder Wombat, Flash as the Flish, Green Lantern as a boar, Aquaman as Aquamandrill, Captain Marvel as Shazham!, Robin as Robin's Egg, and Cyborg as Cybug.
 A new Justice League animated series titled Justice League Action debuted on Cartoon Network in Fall 2016. The series features a revolving cast anchored by Batman, Wonder Woman, and Superman.
 The Justice League appears in Harley Quinn." Its members consist of Superman, Batman, Wonder Woman, Zatanna, Aquaman, Green Lantern (John Stewart), and the Flash. In the episode "Devil's Snare"; Superman, Wonder Woman, Green Lantern and the Flash arrive in Gotham City to stop the tree monsters attacking. They assume Harley's crew is behind the attacks and attempt to send them to the Phantom Zone, but Poison Ivy uses Wonder Woman's lasso of truth to prove them wrong. It was then the League were imprisoned in a magic fairy tale book by the Queen of Fables. In "A Fight Worth Fighting For", the League were finally released by Zatanna, after Harley Quinn and the Joker retrieved the book, in order to defeat Doctor Psycho, who has gained control of a Parademon army and took over Gotham. In the following episode "Lovers' Quarrel", the League, in particular Batman, Superman and Wonder Woman, easily defeat the Parademons and Harley's crew, who are mind-controlled by Psycho, but while attempting to send Poison Ivy to the Phantom Zone, they are stopped by Harley, allowing Ivy to poison them with a toxin that makes them suddenly flirt with one another.

Live action
 Legends of the Superheroes was a 1979 two-part special that adapted the Justice League. It featured Adam West, Burt Ward, and Frank Gorshin returning to their roles from the 1966–1968 live-action Batman television series: Batman, Robin, and the Riddler respectively. Other heroes portrayed on the show included Black Canary, Captain Marvel, Flash, Green Lantern, Hawkman, Huntress, and more.
 Justice League of America was a series pilot produced for CBS in 1997, but failed to sell. The pilot used less well-known characters to avoid the licensing issues surrounding Batman, Superman, and Wonder Woman. The characters used were the Guy Gardner Green Lantern, Fire, Ice, the Barry Allen Flash, and the Ray Palmer Atom set against a version of the Weather Wizard.
 Smallville featured a version of the Justice League in its sixth-season episode "Justice". The members of the team were drawn from versions of DC Comics heroes that had previously appeared in the show: "Impulse" from the season four episode "Run"; "Aquaman" (A.C.) from the season five episode "Aqua"; "Cyborg" (Victor Stone) from the season five episode of the same name, and "Green Arrow" who had been appearing as a regular character through season Six. The episode had the team temporarily recruiting main characters Clark Kent, who Green Arrow dubs "Boy Scout", and Chloe Sullivan, who acts as the team's advisor through a computer network under the codename "Watchtower". Later, in the Season Seven episode "Siren", Dinah Lance joined Oliver's team as the "Black Canary". She returns in the Season Eight premiere with Aquaman and Green Arrow to find Clark. However, after A.C. and Dinah have their identities exposed, Oliver makes the call for the team to temporarily disband. Later in the season, when Oliver reconnects with his heroic side in "Identity", the team reunites. In the episode "Bulletproof", it is mentioned that Detective John Jones (Martian Manhunter) has helped Oliver's team and got Oliver out of trouble with the police and is considered a member of the team. Clark and Chloe become more involved with the League as well, with Clark joining Bart on a mission in Keystone during "Hex", whilst in the same episode Chloe becomes a full-time 'Watchtower' for the team. Dr. Emil is a staff physician at Metropolis General Hospital and Metropolis University, who is also on Oliver Queen's payroll. Season Eight concludes with Flash, Black Canary, Green Arrow, and Clark working together to stop Doomsday. In the closing scenes Chloe reveals that Bart, Dinah, and Oliver have gone missing. In season 9 episode "Absolute Justice" members Green Arrow, Clark, John Jones, and Chloe aid members of the Justice Society of America. In the episode Doctor Fate restores John Jones's powers.

Arrowverse
 The Flash and its related TV series Arrow, Supergirl and Legends of Tomorrow have hinted towards a Justice League in the future, with the heroes of the different series teaming up for annual crossover events. Barry Allen is shown to own a building resembling the Hall of Justice during the Invasion crossover, which the heroes use as a base during that crossover. An A.I. named Gideon from the future claims that Barry as the Flash is a "founding member" before being cut off. The Justice League is directly mentioned in the Arrow episode "Living Proof".
In the end of the Arrowverse crossover Crisis on Infinite Earths, the heroes of the Earth-Prime (an amalgamation of Earth-1, Earth-38 and Black Lightning's Earth), after a memorial for Oliver Queen, sits at a table in an abandoned S.T.A.R. Labs building, creating a new league of heroes. This Justice League's iteration consists of White Canary, The Flash, Supergirl, Batwoman, Superman, Black Lightning and Martian Manhunter, with an empty seat in honor of Green Arrow.

Video games
 The Justice League appears in the video games Justice League Task Force, released in 1995 for the Sega Genesis and Super Nintendo Entertainment System, and Justice League Heroes, released in 2006 as a cross-platform game, as well as several video games based on its animated incarnation.
 Superman, Batman, Wonder Woman, Flash (Barry Allen), Captain Marvel, and Green Lantern (Hal Jordan) appear in Mortal Kombat vs. DC Universe.
 The Justice League is featured prominently in the massively multiplayer online role-playing game DC Universe Online, with the Watchtower serving as the transportation hub between Metropolis and Gotham City.
 The Justice League are the main characters of the mobile video game for iOS Justice League: Earth's Final Defense, developed by Mobicle and published by Netmarble, the companies in South Korea. Superman, Batman, Wonder Woman, Green Lantern and the Flash are playable characters, with Aquaman and Cyborg as non-playable Justice League members. This version of the Justice League is based on the one seen in The New 52.
 The Justice League are the main characters of the upcoming game DC's Justice League: Cosmic Chaos, developed by PHL Collective and published by Outright Games.
 The Justice League are the main antagonists of the upcoming game Suicide Squad: Kill the Justice League, developed by Rocksteady Studios. This iteration consists of Superman, Batman, Wonder Woman, Flash (Barry Allen), and Green Lantern (John Stewart).

Injustice
 The Justice League is also featured in Injustice: Gods Among Us, developed by Netherrealm Studios, the team responsible for the Mortal Kombat series of games.
 A new incarnation of the League is shown in various character endings in the game Injustice 2. The line up is consistent of Batman, Supergirl, Harley Quinn, Green Arrow, Black Canary, Firestorm (Jason Rusch and Martin Stein), Blue Beetle (Jaime Reyes), Green Lantern (Hal Jordan), The Flash (Barry Allen), Catwoman and in his story only Sub-Zero.

Lego
 In Lego Batman 2: DC Super Heroes, Batman and Robin team-up with the Justice League, which consists of Superman, Flash, Wonder Woman, Green Lantern (Hal Jordan), Cyborg and Martian Manhunter.
 The Justice League reappear in Lego Batman 3: Beyond Gotham. Members include Batman, Robin, Superman, Wonder Woman, Flash, Green Lantern (Hal Jordan), Cyborg, Martian Manhunter, Aquaman, Plastic Man, and other heroes.
 The Justice League is featured in Lego DC Super-Villains. As part of the story, they were replaced by a different team of superheroes called the "Justice Syndicate".

References